The 2008 Parramatta Eels season was the 62nd in the club's history. Coached by Michael Hagan and captained by Nathan Cayless, they competed in the National Rugby League's 2008 Telstra Premiership.

Summary
After being billed at premiership contenders by several prominent betting agencies, including TAB SportsBet, the Parramatta Eels failed to impress in the 2008, a season that could only be described as a huge disappointment. The Eels finished 11th in an inconsistent season marred by Jarryd Hayne's controversial shooting incident in the pre-season. Despite the poor performance by Parramatta, CEO Denis Fitzgerald stressed that Michael Hagan's position as club coach was not in danger. Michael Hagan resigned as coach on 21 October 2008, citing family and health reasons for his decision.

Standings

National Rugby League

National Youth Competition

Players and staff
The playing squad and coaching staff of the Parramatta Eels for the 2008 NRL season as of 31 August 2008.

jr.

Transfers
In:

Out:

Awards
Michael Cronin Clubman of the Year Award: Krisnan Inu
Ken Thornett Medal (Players' player): Nathan Hindmarsh
Jack Gibson Award (Coach's award): Matthew Keating
Eric Grothe Rookie of the Year Award: Taulima Tautai

References

Parramatta Eels seasons
Parramatta Eels season